A Marcha das Utopias is a Portuguese-language essay by Brazilian author Oswald de Andrade. It was first published in 1953.

1953 essays
Novels by Oswald de Andrade